"Twenty-Five Miles" is a song written by Johnny Bristol, Harvey Fuqua, and Edwin Starr for Starr's second album, 25 Miles (1969). The song was considered sufficiently similar to "32 Miles out of Waycross" by Hoagy Lands (also recorded as "Mojo Mama" by both Wilson Pickett and Don Varner), written by Bert Berns and Jerry Wexler, that Berns and Wexler were eventually given co-writing credits.  Essentially the same theme also appeared in late 1959 in the approaching miles section of the lyrics of Jimmie Rodgers' "Tucumcari".

It was Starr's first success following his move from Ric-Tic Records to Motown (as Motown bought out Ric-Tic and all its artists).  The song was a huge hit in the US, making the Top Ten on both the Pop Charts (#6) and R&B Charts (#6) and peaked at #36 on the UK Singles Chart.  "Twenty-Five Miles" proved to be Starr's second-biggest US hit, ranking below his signature song (and #1 smash) "War".  His pair of 1979 disco singles would later outdo the song's performance on the UK Charts, as "Contact" and "H.A.P.P.Y. Radio" were both UK Top Ten hits.

Starr's version was popular on the UK's Northern soul scene.

In 1989, Edwin was seen on stage in an appearance of The Cookie Crew's mimed performance on Top Of The Pops - the BBC chart show in the UK, Edwin also miming repeatedly to the lyric "I got to keep on" which was sampled from "Twenty-Five Miles" in the #17 hit "Got To Keep On" of April that year.

In popular culture

A shortened remix of this version was used as the theme song for NFL Network's coverage of the 2011 NFL scouting combine. The song was used by Visa in their 2016 global Olympic campaign film.

The song also shares strong similarities to the theme song for As it Happens, "Curried Soul" by Moe Koffman.

Edwin Starr's version appeared in the 1987 film Adventures in Babysitting and in the 2016 Visa Commercial "Carpool - Road to Rio with Team USA Athletes".

The song was featured playing after the opening scene of Bad Times at the El Royale, when it transitions to 1969.

Michael Jackson version

The Jackson 5 recorded a cover version of "Twenty-Five Miles" in 1969, but it was not heard until its inclusion on the Motown compilation album, The Original Soul of Michael Jackson, in 1987, with Michael Jackson being given sole performer credit for the track. It was not the original recording, however, as it included drum machine overdubs; the original featured a hard-driving drum track by Uriel Jones, one of the Funk Brothers.

Jackson's version of "Twenty-Five Miles" was released as a single in the US to promote The Original Soul of Michael Jackson. The single was backed by the Christmas song "Up on the Housetop". The original recording of the song was included on the 2009 set, Hello World: The Motown Solo Collection.

Covers
In 1969, Clarence Reid (Blowfly (musician)) released a cover of "Twenty Five Miles," on his 1969 ATCO release "Dancin' With Nobody But You Babe."

In 1969, Patrick Samson realized a cover in Italian language titled "Basta" (That's enough) for his album Crimson and clover (Soli si muore) (Carosello Records, PLP 325) published in Italy and Canada. 

In 1971, Melba Moore featured "Twenty Five Miles" in a medley with the song "Walk A Mile In My Shoes" on her album Look What You're Doing to the Man.

References

Edwin Starr songs
1969 singles
Michael Jackson songs
1987 singles
Songs written by Johnny Bristol
Songs written by Harvey Fuqua
Songs written by Bert Berns
Songs written by Jerry Wexler
1968 songs
Northern soul songs
Gordy Records singles